Wayne L. Stetski (born May 23, 1952) is a Canadian politician and former provincial park Regional Manager. He served as the Member of Parliament for Kootenay—Columbia  in the 42nd Canadian Parliament. He was elected to that position in the 2015 Canadian federal election as a member of the New Democratic Party. During that parliament he sponsored two private member bills: one to make the Friday before Thanksgiving Day be known as "National Local Food Day" and another to add various lakes and rivers to Navigable Waters Protection Act. Stetski acted as the NDP Critic for National Parks for the duration of the 42nd Canadian Parliament. He was defeated in the 2019 Canadian federal election.

Prior to being elected to parliament, Stetski sought election as mayor of Cranbrook, British Columbia in 2008, 2011, and 2014. Though lost the 2008 election, he won in 2011 and served three years as mayor. He lost his re-election bid, as other Cranbrook incumbents in 2014 Prior to being mayor, Stetski worked 35 years with national and provincial parks and protected areas, including as the Kootenay Regional Manager for the BC Ministry of Environment.

Career
Stetski had a 35 year career working with national and provincial parks and protected areas. His career began as a naturalist for Pacific Rim National Park Reserve as a summer job while attending the University of Manitoba where he earned a science degree in ecology and education. He worked for Manitoba Parks before moving to British Columbia where he worked as a BC Parks manager for visitor services. He transitioned to the Manager for East Kootenay parks in 1980, and later became the regional manager of the Kootenay parks. Stetski had lived in Cranbrook since 1990 and been an active member in the community, raising three children and volunteering with the a local church and theatre, coaching hockey and baseball. Stetski changed jobs in 2009 to become the manager of the non-profit group East Kootenay Conservation.

Politics
With the mayor of Cranbrook retiring, the 56 year old Stetski stood for election to replace him in the 2008 local government election. With 46% of the vote, he lost to Cranbrook councillor Scott Manjak. Stetski became a board member with the local United Way and the vice-president of the Citizens for a Livable Cranbrook Society during its opposition to urban expansion on the land across the Cranbrook Community Forest. In 2011, with  Manjak opting not to seek re-election, Stetski again ran for mayor. This time, he won the election with 45% of the vote. As mayor, he was also appointed to the board of the Regional District of East Kootenay and the Columbia River Treaty Government's Committee. He stood for re-election in 2014 but lost, along with all other Cranbrook incumbents, with 38% of the vote.

The 62 year old Stetski quickly rebounded by being acclaimed, in March 2015, the NDP nominee for the Kootenay—Columbia riding in the upcoming October 2015 federal election. Though incumbent the Member of Parliament, David Wilks of the Conservative Party, was seeking re-election, polling found the riding too close to call with both Wilks and Stetski polling at 37% among decided voters. Stetski did go on to win the election with 37% of the vote but his NDP was reduced to third party status to a Liberal Party majority. During the 42nd Canadian Parliament Stetski was the NDP critic for National Parks issues and sponsored two private member bills. On June 1, 2016, he introduced Bill C-281, titled the National Local Food Day Act, which sought to make the Friday before Thanksgiving Day is to be known as "National Local Food Day". The bill was passed by the House of Commons on November 8, 2018, but was blocked by the Conservative Party in the Senate. His second private member bill, Bill C-385, sought to re-insert numerous lakes and rivers such as Trout Lake, Duncan Lake, Windermere Lake, Columbia Lake, Kicking Horse River, Elk River, and Salmo River back into the Navigable Waters Protection Act. However, Bill C-385 did not advance past first reading as the government bill C-69 was amending the same act to re-define what water bodies and watercourses are deemed to be reviewable as navigable waters.

Stetski was seeking re-election as the Kootenay—Columbia member of parliament in the October 2019 federal election. He was defeated by retired law enforcement administrator Rob Morrison of the Conservative Party, and was contested by retired forester Rick Stewart for the People's Party, advocate Trev Miller for the Animal Protection Party and Nelson residents Abra Brynne for the Green Party and Terry Tiessen for the Libertarian Party. Stetski's last day in office was October 21, 2019.

Electoral record

Federal

Provincial

Municipal

References

External links

NDP - Wayne Stetski

Living people
British Columbia civil servants
New Democratic Party MPs
Members of the House of Commons of Canada from British Columbia
Mayors of places in British Columbia
People from Churchill, Manitoba
United Ways people
21st-century Canadian politicians
1952 births